Coconut Island Airport  is an airport located on Coconut Island (Poruma Island) in Queensland, Australia.

Airlines and destinations

Accident and incident 
On 16 January 1999, Uzu Air Britten-Norman Islander VH-XFF was operating a passenger and cargo flight from Horn Island, NT with three passengers and one pilot, when on final approach the pilot noticed a vehicle was parked on the runway with nobody attending to it. The pilot initiated a go-around. Witnesses reported the aircraft entered a shallow climb before pitching sharply right and crashing into a tidal flat. The pilot and two passengers were killed. The surviving passenger was seriously injured.

See also
 List of airports in Queensland

References

Airports in Queensland
Torres Strait Islands communities